Camp House may refer to:

in New Zealand
Camp House (Taranaki), a New Zealand Historic Places Trust property in Taranaki

in the United States

Moses Camp House, Winsted, Connecticut, listed on the National Register of Historic Places (NRHP) in Litchfield County
Elam-Camp House, Gordon, Georgia, NRHP-listed
Elisha Camp House, Sackets Harbor, New York, NRHP-listed
Hermon Camp House, Trumansburg, New York, NRHP-listed
William Nelson Camp, Jr., House, Fairview, North Carolina, NRHP-listed
Camp-Woods, Villanova, Pennsylvania, a historic house, NRHP-listed
Greystone (Knoxville, Tennessee), also known as Camp House
William and Medora Camp House, Greenville, Texas, NRHP-listed in Hunt County
Thomas Camp Farmhouse, Menomonee Falls, Wisconsin, NRHP-listed in Waukesha County